On 1 May 1994, Brazilian Formula One driver Ayrton Senna was killed after his car crashed into a concrete barrier while he was leading the 1994 San Marino Grand Prix at the Autodromo Enzo e Dino Ferrari in Italy. The previous day, Austrian driver Roland Ratzenberger had died when his car crashed during qualification for the race. His and Senna's crashes were the worst of several that took place that weekend (including a serious one involving Rubens Barrichello) and were the first fatal collisions to occur during a Formula One race meeting in 12 years and not repeated until the fatal crash of Jules Bianchi at the 2014 Japanese Grand Prix at Suzuka Circuit. This became a turning point in the safety of Formula One, prompting the implementation of new safety measures in both Formula One and the circuit, as well as the Grand Prix Drivers' Association to be reestablished. The Supreme Court of Cassation of Italy ruled that mechanical failure was the cause of the crash.

Background
In 1994, Senna left his longtime team McLaren, which he had joined in 1988 and won three World Drivers' Championships with in 1988, 1990 and 1991, to join Williams, replacing his former teammate Alain Prost. There he was paired with Damon Hill. Williams was expected to contend for the F1 World Championship as they had in the previous two seasons with Prost and Nigel Mansell, albeit with cars that no longer had electronic aids, which had been banned for the 1994 season.

On debut for his new team during the traditional pre-season testing at Estoril, Senna said of the Williams FW16:

The problems continued as the season commenced. Senna had his worst ever start to a Formula One season, failing to finish or score points in the first two races (the Brazilian and Pacific Grands Prix), despite having taken pole in both. Benetton's Michael Schumacher was the championship leader entering the third race at Imola, with Senna trailing by 20 points.

1994 San Marino Grand Prix

Senna got out of his Williams car and went to the scene of the collision. Barrichello's tongue blocked his airway and emergency work done by FIA doctor Sid Watkins saved his life. Barrichello regained consciousness and found Senna looking over him. After learning Barrichello had survived, Senna returned to his car and continued his practice session.

After the session concluded, he left his car and went to the Williams motor home to attend pre-arranged interviews for the press and told the attending journalists to wait one hour while he was checking car problems with his engineer, David Brown. Following the interviews, Senna continued his work with Brown for another two hours. Once he arrived back at his hotel in Castel San Pietro, Senna reportedly telephoned his girlfriend Adriane Galisteu and broke down into tears while recounting Barrichello's crash earlier that day.

On Saturday morning, Senna set a personal best time of 1m 22.03 seconds and agreed with teammate Damon Hill that the car had improved. Having been released from the Medical Centre, Barrichello told Senna he was flying back to England to watch the race on television.

After the impact with a concrete barrier, the car bounced off and rested in the middle of that section of the track. Senna saw the replays of the collision and rushed into the pitlane to get inside a course car. When he arrived, with Ratzenberger taken into an ambulance, Senna inspected the damaged Simtek. He then attended the circuit's Medical Centre where he learnt from neurosurgeon Sid Watkins that Ratzenberger had died from injuries sustained in the accident. When the two left the centre together, Watkins told Senna that he did not have to race ever again and suggested that he withdraw from the race and go fishing with him. Senna responded by telling Watkins he could not stop racing and then went back to the Williams garage, where he summoned Patrick Head and Frank Williams, telling them of the situation and deciding to withdraw for the remainder of the qualifying session.

Reportedly, Senna retired to his motor home where he broke down in tears and collapsed onto the floor. This had concerned Williams, who asked Betise Assumpção, Senna's PR chief to arrange a meeting to discuss Senna's emotional state. Senna decided not to attend the post-qualifying press conference, leading the FIA to discuss but decide not to take disciplinary action against him. On the following day, however, race stewards called Senna out of his motor home to discuss his having commandeered a course car to visit Ratzenberger's crash site. A row ensued and Senna stormed off in disgust. The stewards decided to take no action.

On Sunday morning, Senna was the fastest in the warm-up session by nine-tenths of a second. Afterwards he saw former McLaren rival Alain Prost sitting at a table. They talked together for 30 minutes, with Senna lobbying for Prost's help to improve the sport's safety, both agreeing to meet before the Monaco Grand Prix.

Next, Senna filmed an in-car lap of Imola for French television channel TF1, where he greeted Prost now working as a presenter for that channel: "A special hello to our dear friend Alain. We all miss you, Alain." Prost said that he was amazed and very touched by the comment.

At the drivers' briefing, Senna attended along with Gerhard Berger. Since he was unwilling to speak out due to the earlier row with race officials that had left him still fraught with emotions, Senna asked Berger to raise his concerns about the pace car's presence during formation lap, which had no role other than to promote the then latest Porsche 911. At the San Marino Grand Prix, this pace car was thus made to leave the grid in advance of the Formula One cars, instead of together.

Senna then met with fellow drivers to discuss the re-establishment of a drivers' group (the Grand Prix Drivers' Association) in an attempt to increase safety in Formula One. As the most senior driver, Senna offered to take the role of leader, starting with the next race event in Monaco. Niki Lauda suggested that Senna lead the group because of his strong personality and standing in the sport, relative to the other drivers.

Racing crash 

At the start of the race, Pedro Lamy and JJ Lehto were involved in a serious collision, spraying debris into the crowd and injuring bystanders. Track officials deployed the Opel Vectra safety car, driven by Formula Three driver Max Angelelli, to slow down the field and allow the removal of debris. The competitors proceeded behind the safety car for five laps. As the Vectra was based on a family sedan and not relatively fast, Senna had pulled alongside the Vectra to gesture to its driver to speed up; this car was subsequently regarded as inadequate for the role (due to the fact that its brakes had overheated and thus had to be driven slowly, lest itself be the cause of a crash) and a cause of the alleged drop in tyre pressures of the following Formula One cars. Before the sixth lap, David Brown told Senna via pit-to-car radio that the safety car was pulling off, and Senna acknowledged the message.

On lap 6, the race resumed and Senna immediately set a quick pace with the third-quickest lap of the race, followed by Schumacher. At the flat-out left-hander Tamburello corner, Schumacher noticed that Senna took a tight line through the curve and his car jiggled on the bumps.

On lap 7, the second lap at racing speed, Senna's car left the racing line at Tamburello, ran in a straight line off the track and struck an unprotected concrete barrier. The car hit the wall at a shallow angle, tearing off the right front wheel and nose cone before spinning to a halt.

After Senna's car stopped, he was initially motionless in the cockpit. After about ten seconds, as recorded by the close-up aerial footage, his head was seen to lift to the left before returning to its original position. Thereafter he did not move again. The right front wheel had shot up upon impact and entered the cockpit, striking the right frontal area of his helmet. The violence of the wheel's impact shoved his head back against the headrest (which was already far forward from the car's impact with the wall) causing fatal skull fractures. In addition, a piece of suspension attached to the wheel had also partially penetrated his Bell M3 helmet and caused trauma to his head. Also, it appeared that a jagged piece of the upright assembly had penetrated the helmet visor just above his right eye. Senna was using a medium-sized (58 cm) M3 helmet with a new "thin" Bell visor. Any one of the three injuries would probably have killed him.

After the crash, it was immediately evident that Senna had suffered some form of injury, because his helmet was seen to be motionless and leaning slightly to the right. The subtle movement of his head in the seconds that followed raised false hopes. Moments after the crash, Angelo Orsi, a photographer and a friend of Senna, took photographs of Senna in the car after his helmet was removed and Senna being treated before marshals blocked his view. Despite receiving numerous offers, the photographs have only been seen by Orsi and the Senna family, who insisted that Orsi not publish the photographs.

Fire marshals arrived at the car and were unable to touch Senna before qualified medical personnel arrived. Senna was pulled out of the car within minutes. Television coverage from an overhead helicopter was seen around the world, as rescue workers gave Senna medical attention. Close inspection of the area in which the medical staff treated Senna revealed a considerable amount of blood on the ground, probably from the pieces of suspension and upright assembly penetrating his helmet, which had ruptured his superficial temporal artery. From visible injuries to Senna's head, it was evident to attending medical professionals that he had sustained a grave head trauma. An emergency tracheotomy was conducted alongside the track to establish a secure airway through which the medical personnel could artificially maintain his breathing. The race was stopped one minute and nine seconds after Senna's crash. Williams team manager Ian Harrison went up to race control, finding a scene where many race officials were sensing that Senna's crash had been serious. Bernie Ecclestone later arrived in race control to calm the situation.

Neurosurgeon Sid Watkins, the head of Formula One's on-track medical team, performed the on-site tracheotomy on Senna. Watkins later reported:

Watkins cleared the respiratory passages, stemmed the blood flow, replaced lost blood and immobilised the cervical area. Watkins radioed for a medical helicopter and asked the intensive care anaesthetist, Giovanni Gordini, to escort Senna to Maggiore Hospital.

During the safety car period, Érik Comas brought his Larrousse-Ford to the pit lane to correct a vibration issue caused by contact under a yellow flag on the first lap. Shortly after the helicopter landed on the racing surface, Comas left the pit area and attempted to rejoin the now red-flagged Grand Prix due to a miscommunication with his crew. The race marshals waved frantically at Comas as he approached Tamburello, since he was apparently unaware of what was taking place, and he slammed on his brakes in time to stop the Larousse and avoid a collision with the medical helicopter. When he spotted Comas approaching the accident scene, John Watson — covering the events as an analyst for EuroSport — said it was the "most ridiculous thing I've ever seen at any time in my life".

Senna's car was eventually lifted onto a truck and returned to the pit lane where officials impounded it. However, an unidentified person insisted that the black-box data carried on the car be removed. At 3:00p.m., around 43 minutes after the crash, the helicopter landed in front of the Maggiore Hospital. Doctors rushed Senna into intensive care; a brain scan confirmed the diagnosis made on the track. At 3:10p.m., Senna's heart stopped beating, doctors restarted his heart, and he was placed on a life-support machine. Senna's brother Leonardo arranged for a priest to perform the last rites which occurred at 6:15p.m. Senna's heart stopped beating again at 6:37p.m., and it was decided not to restart it. Doctor Maria Teresa Fiandri, the emergency department head physician at the hospital who was off-duty and had been watching the race live from home with her sons, immediately left for the hospital and arrived at the same time as Senna's helicopter landed. In her interview after 20 years, she confirmed that the blood loss suffered by Senna was due to a damaged superficial temporal artery and that, apart from his head injuries, Senna appeared serene and the rest of the body was intact. Fiandri became responsible for providing medical updates to the media and public that had amassed at the hospital and, at about 7:00p.m., she announced that Senna died at 6:40p.m.

It was later revealed that, as medical staff examined Senna, a furled Austrian flag was found in his car—a flag that he had intended to raise in honour of Ratzenberger if he won the race.
 
Some time after the race, Ian Harrison was called by an Italian lawyer informing Harrison of Senna's death and that it was being treated as a "road traffic accident". Early in the morning of 2 May, Harrison was called by another lawyer, who took him to a mortuary. Harrison declined to see Senna's body upon being asked.

Following some stability and aerodynamic issues Senna's Williams FW16 was re-engineered by Adrian Newey to provide better handling at the request of Senna and Hill.  After the end of the season, the cars were significantly changed to be safer. At Imola, Tamburello was changed from a flat-out left-hander to a chicane and a slow left-hander.

State funeral

Senna's death was considered by many of his Brazilian fans to be a national tragedy, and the Brazilian government declared three days of national mourning. In an exception to airline policy, Senna's coffin was allowed to be flown back to his home country not as cargo but in the passenger cabin of a Varig McDonnell Douglas MD-11 commercial jetliner to São Paulo–Guarulhos International Airport, accompanied by his younger brother, Leonardo, and close friends. Senna's coffin was covered with a large Brazilian flag.

The funeral, which took place on 5 May 1994, was broadcast live on Brazilian television and an estimated three million people lined the streets of his hometown of São Paulo. Motor racing figures who attended Senna's state funeral included Alain Prost, Gerhard Berger, Jackie Stewart, Damon Hill, Thierry Boutsen, Rubens Barrichello (Ayrton's new protégé) and Emerson Fittipaldi who were among the pallbearers. Watkins and then McLaren team coordinator Jo Ramírez did not attend as they were so grief-stricken. Senna's family did not allow Formula One Management president Bernie Ecclestone to attend, and Fédération Internationale de l'Automobile (FIA) president Max Mosley instead attended the funeral of Roland Ratzenberger which took place on 7 May 1994, in Salzburg, Austria. Mosley said in a press conference ten years later, "I went to his funeral because everyone went to Senna's. I thought it was important that somebody went to his." Senna was buried at the Morumbi Cemetery in São Paulo. His grave bears the epitaph  (Nothing can separate me from God's love).

At the Tokyo headquarters of Honda, where McLaren-Honda cars were typically displayed after each race, so many floral tributes were received after Senna's death that they overwhelmed the large exhibit lobby, even though Senna was no longer driving for a Honda-powered team (Honda had pulled out of Formula One after 1992, although its tuning partner Mugen Motorsports remained in the sport to supply Team Lotus that year). Senna had a special relationship with company founder Soichiro Honda and was revered in Japan. For the next race at Monaco, the FIA decided to leave the first two grid positions empty and painted them with the colours of the Brazilian and the Austrian flags, to honour Senna and Ratzenberger.

Aftermath

Reactions
Five-time World Champion Juan Manuel Fangio was watching the race from his home in Balcarce, Argentina. He said after the accident "I knew he was dead".

ESPN, which broadcast the San Marino Grand Prix in the United States, also carried the Winston Select 500 NASCAR Winston Cup race at Talladega Superspeedway in Talladega, Alabama later the same day. With the race under a caution period on Lap 111 and Dale Earnhardt leading, lead commentator Bob Jenkins informed the audience that Senna had died. As a tribute, the ESPN booth of Jenkins, Ned Jarrett, and Benny Parsons went silent once the green flag came back out on the next lap. The moment of silence ended after a multiple-car incident caused another caution flag period within two laps of the restart. Earnhardt went on to win the race that afternoon. Once he emerged from his car, Earnhardt spoke with ESPN's Jerry Punch in Victory Lane and extended his condolences to Senna's friends and family. Nearly seven years later, Earnhardt himself died in an incident on the last lap of the 2001 Daytona 500.

Among Senna's millions of fans was future NASCAR driver Brad Keselowski, who was ten years old at the time of Senna's death. 20 years later, Keselowski drew parallels between the deaths of Senna and Earnhardt in a piece for NASCAR's website.

In Brazil, the country's television networks spent the rest of the day interrupting their normal programming schedules to announce Senna's death and replay his last interview, given to the media on the day before the crash. Many motor racing fans gathered outside of Maggiore Hospital to pay their respects to Senna, causing major traffic jams. Fans also gathered in the Williams F1 factory in Didcot where around 200 people attended with flowers laid on the front gates of the factory.

The Italian and Brazilian press were critical of the FIA for the rule changes that were enacted for 1994. Benetton driver Schumacher called for improvements in safety. BBC Sport commentator Murray Walker called Senna's death the "blackest day for Grand Prix racing that I can remember".

Two and a half months later, following Brazil's victory over Italy in the 1994 FIFA World Cup, the Brazilian squad dedicated their World Cup victory to Senna.

Safety improvements

On 3 May, the FIA called a meeting at the request of the Italian Automobile Club to review the events of the weekend. Later on, the governing body announced new safety measures for the next round in Monaco which included the following three changes:

 Entry to and exit from the pit lane would be controlled by a curve to force cars to run at a reduced speed
 No team personnel would be allowed onto the pit lane surface except those directly involved with working on a car during a scheduled pit stop
 A draw would be arranged to determine the scheduled order in which cars make pit stops. Stops made out of the designated order will be limited to emergencies only and cars would not be allowed to take on fuel or new tires.

On 8 May, it was reported that Federico Bendinelli, an official who worked at Imola, said Senna had inspected the Tamburello corner and declared it was "O.K." Williams ran tests on one of their rigs attempting to replicate Senna's accident from the data retrieved. They attempted to simulate a mechanical failure which had not proven conclusive.

At the next race in Monaco, retired world champion Niki Lauda announced the reformation of the Grand Prix Drivers' Association (GPDA). The representatives elected were Lauda and active drivers Michael Schumacher, Gerhard Berger and Martin Brundle. At the end of the season, the GPDA demanded the FIA improve the safety of Formula One. The FIA responded quickly and introduced changes to the regulations as follows:

For the Spanish Grand Prix:
 the size of diffusers would be reduced;
 the front wing end plates would be raised;
 the size of the front wing would be reduced.
All together this would reduce the amount of downforce by about 15%.

For the Canadian Grand Prix:
 the lateral protection of the drivers' heads would be improved by increasing the height of the sides of the cockpit;
 the minimum weight of a Formula One car would be increased by 25 kg (changed to 15 kg by Canadian GP);
 the front wishbones would be strengthened to reduce the possibility of a front wheel coming loose and striking the driver;
 the cockpit would be lengthened to prevent drivers striking their head on the front of the cockpit;
 the use of pump petrol would be imposed;
 the airboxes from the engines would be removed to reduce the airflow to the engines and thus decrease the power available.

Other changes included improved crash barriers, redesigned tracks and tyre barriers, higher crash safety standards, higher sills on the driver cockpit and a limit on 3-litre engines. The FIA immediately investigated the Autodromo Enzo e Dino Ferrari in Imola, and the track's signature Tamburello turn was changed into a left–right chicane as a result.

In February 1995, a 500-page report by a team of judicial investigators was handed over to Italian prosecutors which attributed Senna's crash to steering column failure caused by a pre-race adjustment.

Autopsy
During legal proceedings before the Italian courts on 3 March 1997, based on the expert testimony and evidence of the pathologist, Dr Cipolla, Senna's official time of death was recorded as 2:17 pm on 1 May 1994, coinciding with cerebral death under Italian law, upon Senna hitting the Tamburello wall. The FIA and Italian motorsport authorities still maintain that Senna was not killed instantly, but rather died in the hospital, where he had been rushed by helicopter after an emergency tracheotomy and IV administration were performed on the track.

There is an ongoing debate as to why Senna was not declared dead at the track. Under Italian law, collisions resulting in a fatality must be investigated for any criminal culpability. The activities that cause the fatality, such as a sporting event, must be suspended forthwith and the scene of the crash secured.

The former Director of the Oporto (Portugal) Legal Medicine Institute, Professor José Eduardo Pinto da Costa, has stated the following:

Professor José Pratas Vital, Director of the Egas Moniz Hospital in Lisbon, a neurosurgeon and Head of the Medical Staff at the Portuguese GP, offered a different opinion:

Rogério Morais Martins, creative director of Ayrton Senna Promotions (which became the Ayrton Senna Institute after Senna's death), stated that:

Italian prosecution
The Williams team was entangled for many years in Italian criminal court proceedings after prosecutors instigated manslaughter charges against key team officials. On 16 December 1997, Frank Williams and five others were acquitted of the charges, ending the threat of a boycott of Formula One in Italy. In a 381-page ruling, Judge Antonio Costanzo concluded that steering column failure was the probable cause of Senna's crash; however, there was no proof of negligence on the part of Head or Newey, or that they had designed the modifications in the first place. On 22 November 1999, an appeals court upheld the acquittals, rejecting a request from prosecutors to give one-year suspended sentences to Head and Newey. In April 2002, Senna's FW16 chassis number 02 was returned to the Williams team. Although an initial report by Autosport stated the car had been destroyed by the team (as it was in an advanced state of deterioration), a spokesman stated otherwise, but also stated that the car's ultimate fate would be a 'private matter'. Senna's helmet was returned to Bell, and was incinerated. The car's engine was returned to Renault, where its fate is unknown.

In January 2003, the Italian Supreme Court reopened the case, ruling that "material errors" had been made in Bologna court of appeal. On 27 May 2005, the court gave a full acquittal to Adrian Newey, while the case against Head was "timed out" under a statute of limitations. A retrial was ordered by Italy's highest court in 2005.

On 13 April 2007, the Italian Supreme Court of Cassation delivered its own verdict (number 15050) stating that: "It has been determined that the accident was caused by a steering column failure. This failure was caused by badly designed and badly executed modifications. The responsibility for this falls on Patrick Head, culpable of omitted control". However, Head was not arrested since the Italian statute of limitations for culpable homicide was 7 years and 6 months, and the verdict was pronounced 13 years after the crash.

The criminal charges had focused on the car's steering column, which was found to have sheared off at a point where a modification had been made. The prosecution alleged that the column had failed, causing the crash, and the Williams team conceded to this failure but only as caused by the crash impact. In the weeks preceding the San Marino Grand Prix, Senna reportedly had asked his team to alter the steering column in order to give him more room in the cockpit. Patrick Head and Adrian Newey satisfied Senna's request by having the FW16's existing shaft cut and extended with a smaller-diameter piece of tubing that was welded together with reinforcing plates. The modification was carried out in this manner as there was insufficient time to instead manufacture a new steering shaft in time for the race.

A 600-page technical report was submitted by the University of Bologna under Professor of Engineering Enrico Lorenzini and his team of specialists. The report concluded that fatigue cracks had developed through most of the steering column at the point where it had broken. Lorenzini stated: "It had been badly welded together about a third of the way down and couldn't stand the strain of the race. We discovered scratches on the crack in the steering rod. It seemed like the job had been done in a hurry but I can't say how long before the race. Someone had tried to smooth over the joint following the welding. I have never seen anything like it. I believe the rod was faulty and probably cracked even during the warm-up. Moments before the crash only a tiny piece was left connected and therefore the car didn't respond in the bend."

An analysis of the onboard camera video was submitted by Cineca, which tracked the movement of the steering wheel during the race. Having rotated in a fixed arc during the previous laps, during the final seconds a yellow button on the wheel moved several centimetres away from its normal trajectory, with the steering wheel tilting in its own plane, indicating a breaking steering column. Williams introduced its own video to prove the movement was normal in which David Coulthard manhandled an FW16B steering wheel, the effort required to deflect the wheel termed as "quite considerable". Michele Alboreto testified that the steering wheel movement was abnormal, stating that the video "proves that something was broken in Senna's Williams. No steering wheel moves a few centimetres."

In May 2011, Williams FW16 designer Adrian Newey expressed his views about the crash:

Alternative hypotheses

Driver error
Patrick Head, technical director of Williams, believed that Senna had made a driving error. Michael Schumacher had told him after the race that Senna's car looked 'nervous' the previous lap. Damon Hill said he is convinced that Senna made a mistake.

Tyre puncture
Adrian Newey, who designed Senna's car, said he believes a tyre puncture may have caused Senna to crash. There was debris on the track following the JJ Lehto crash. Riccardo Patrese suffered a right rear tyre failure at Tamburello during practice for the 1992 Grand Prix, yet his car (an active suspension FW14B) was seen to be spinning before even leaving the track.

See also
List of Formula One fatalities
Senna, a 2010 documentary film about his life on the track including footage of the crash

References

Sources

External links

1994 in Brazilian motorsport
1994 in Formula One
1994 in Italian motorsport
20th century in Emilia-Romagna
Accidental deaths in Italy
Death
Deaths by person in Italy
Filmed deaths in motorsport
Death
Funerals in Brazil
Funerals by person
May 1994 events in Europe
Sport deaths in Italy